Josiah Hill (born December 15, 1976) is an American politician serving in the Minnesota House of Representatives since 2023. A member of the Minnesota Democratic-Farmer-Labor Party (DFL), Hill represents District 33B in the eastern Twin Cities metropolitan area, which includes the cities of Stillwater, Forest Lake and Bayport and parts of Washington County, Minnesota.

Early life, education and career 
Hill received his bachelor's degree in English from the University of Wisconsin, his doctors in education from Hamline University, and his masters of science in education for English/language arts from the Hamline University.

Minnesota House of Representatives 
Hill was first elected to the Minnesota House of Representatives in 2022, after the retirement of DFL incumbent Shelly Christensen. Hill unsuccessfully ran for the Minnesota Senate in 2020, losing to Republican incumbent Karin Housley.

Hill serves as vice-chair of the Education Policy Committee, and also sits on the Labor and Industry Finance and Policy and Education Finance Committees.

Electoral history

Personal life 
Hill lives in Stillwater, Minnesota with his wife, Emily, and has three children.

References

External links 

Living people
1976 births
Democratic Party members of the Minnesota House of Representatives
21st-century American politicians
University of Wisconsin alumni
Hamline University alumni
People from Stillwater, Minnesota